The 1927 Drexel Dragons football team represented Drexel Institute of Art, Science, and Industry—now known as Drexel University—in the 1927 college football season. The team was led by Walter Halas in his first season as head coach.

Schedule

Roster

References

Drexel
Drexel Dragons football seasons
Drexel Dragons football